This article describes trends in popular music in the 2010s. See also 2010s in the music industry.

Musical trends 

By the mid-2010s, the hushed style of vocal delivery commonly used in indie music garnered widespread popularity among pop artists, used often by Selena Gomez, Lana Del Rey, Lorde and Birdy. The Guardian dubbed this style as "whisperpop", characterized by subdued vocals, muted notes and breathy intensity.

Traditional instruments, such as the mandolin, dulcimer, ukulele, bongos, and accordion, were used more often, especially by indie rock musicians and singer-songwriters, including Mumford and Sons, Vance Joy, Phillip Phillips, and The Lumineers, along with country players, such as Chris Stapleton and Zac Brown Band.

Adult contemporary music had been successful on the charts. Pop acts like Taylor Swift, Justin Bieber, Bruno Mars, Ed Sheeran, Adele, P!nk, Shawn Mendes, Kelly Clarkson, Maroon 5, had achieved a No. 1 single during the decade. Artists like Sara Bareilles, Jason Mraz, Michael Bublé, Charlie Puth, Colbie Caillat, Christina Perri, CeeLo Green, and Shawn Mendes all incorporated soul, pop rock, and folk into their music.

Throughout the 2010s, hip hop music grew as a genre. In 2017, with the increase in streaming services influence over the Billboard Hot 100 rap music became the most popular genre in the US in its 4th decade of growth, surpassing Rock and Pop music. Artists like Kendrick Lamar, Drake, Future, Chance the Rapper, Nicki Minaj, Travis Scott, Playboi Carti, J. Cole, Gucci Mane, Migos, Young Thug, Lil B, Tyler, The Creator, ASAP Rocky, 21 Savage, Cardi B, Big Sean, Lil Uzi Vert, Lil Yachty, XXXTentacion and Juice WRLD all rose to prominence in this decade. In the decade movements like Trap music, Cloud rap, Drill music, and Emo hip hop became mainstream. The 2010s are also notable for the increasing prominence of rap producers; examples being  Young Chop, Lex Luger, Sonny Digital, DJ Mustard, Metro Boomin, Southside,  DJ Khaled and Pi'erre Bourne .

Progressive and experimental rock have started to become widespread, mainly in the second half of the decade. Artists, such as Nothing More, Highly Suspect, Twelve Foot Ninja, Dead Letter Circus, and Marmozets, and DIY ethic bands, including Bad Omens, Sylar, Æges, and Silver Snakes, have enjoyed success through concerts and streaming services.

EDM had become more mainstream due to the releases of Britney Spears' Blackout and Kanye West's "Stronger"; some 2010s successes include David Guetta, Skrillex, Steve Aoki, Swedish House Mafia, Headhunterz, Wildstylez, Da Tweekaz, Clean Bandit, Major Lazer, DVBBS, Avicii, Alesso, Owl City, The Chainsmokers, Calvin Harris, DJ Snake, Diplo, ShockOne, Drumsound & Bassline Smith, Blasterjaxx, Martin Garrix, Marshmello, Alan Walker and Zedd. The prominence of novel EDM genres in the pop sphere like Future Bass and Trap (EDM) resulted in newer styles and innovations within the dance-pop sound, though house genres like Future House, Tropical house, and Electro House remained the most common regardless. The latter was especially popular in the early part of the decade continuing from late 2000s. Reggaetón and Dancehall were other major influences for many dance-pop hits.

The genres of Europop and Eurodance have also achieved notable commercial success, evidenced by Swedish producer Max Martin's ubiquity in the decade's most successful pop albums. Katy Perry's Teenage Dream (2010) drew heavily from this style and became the first album by a female artist in history to release five number one U.S. singles. Europop and electronica were used more extensively in the early 2010s as a result of the success of disk jockeys, like David Guetta and Calvin Harris, also influencing the work of female solo acts like Rihanna, Lady Gaga, Robyn, and Kesha. Some of the best-selling songs of the decade, including "Only Girl (In the World)" and "S&M" by Rihanna, were strongly influenced by Eurodance.  In 2012, a large number of songs by American instrumentalists featured quintessential Eurodance elements, especially synthesizer and strong beats during the chorus mixed with rapping or vocals for verses. Flo Rida, Pitbull, LMFAO, and The Black Eyed Peas were popular hip-house acts from the early half of the 2010s.

Teen pop had made a significant comeback throughout the decade, with the likes of Demi Lovato, Selena Gomez, Justin Bieber and Ariana Grande. Like their predecessors, Britney Spears, Christina Aguilera, and Justin Timberlake, who rose to fame in the late 90s and early 2000s, most of these stars were exclusively associated or with Disney Channel and Nickelodeon at the genesis of careers.  An exception is Canadian artist Justin Bieber who rose to fame through YouTube and social media. Throughout the 2010s, they have expanded control over their careers and come of age with their music to varying degrees of success, and many teen pop musicians outside the former companies have continued to launch promising careers throughout the 2010s.

Throughout the 2010s, different movements in music and the music industry have been formed because of the rise of social media such as YouTube, TikTok, and SoundCloud. Some new, sometimes unique, genres of music have been introduced such as vaporwave, whilst other previously “underground” genres such as lofi hip hop and bedroom pop received increased mainstream exposure. Vaporwave music is one of the first genres of music that had an "aesthetic", which was influenced heavily by elements from the 1980s and 1990s. Bedroom pop grew in popularity in the mid to late 2010s on platforms such as YouTube with amateur artists rising to fame making pop music from their bedroom using inexpensive music creation equipment and software such as GarageBand. A distinct feature of bedroom pop is that the lyrics are written completely by the artists, without editors cleaning them up, which is rare in mainstream pop. Some of these genres' elements influenced more mainstream pop music by the latter end of the 2010s, continuing into the 2020s.

Since 2011, boy bands and girl groups have returned to mainstream popularity for the first time after the early 2000s, with the most popular examples being British-Irish boy band One Direction and American boy band Big Time Rush. A new generation of successful girl groups was ushered in by acts such as Little Mix and Fifth Harmony. In addition to this, K-Pop groups, benefiting from high visibility on social media and video sharing sites like YouTube, began to capitalize on their viral power and monetize overseas markets by conducting sold-out tours in Western markets during the mid-2010s. Korean acts such as BigBang, Exo, and BTS sold out US tours with little to no promotion or support from mainstream media sources like TV & Radio Airplay.

In Latin America, Latin pop had remained the main subgenre. Tropical, reggaeton, moombahton, soca have also been popular genres while pop rock continues to be successful. In December 2016, Billboard magazine named Enrique Iglesias the 14th most successful and top male dance club artist of all time. "Despacito" by Luis Fonsi and Daddy Yankee becomes the highest-certified song of all-time in the United States after receiving a 13× platinum certification by the Recording Industry Association of America for units of over 13 million sales plus track-equivalent streams.

Soundtracks from films have topped the charts this decade as well, with number 1 singles from Lady Gaga, Bradley Cooper, Wiz Khalifa, Charlie Puth, Justin Timberlake and Pharrell Williams, along with top 10 entries by The Weeknd, Ellie Goulding, and others.

Dubstep and drumstep became widespread subgenres in the early 2010s on both sides of the Atlantic Ocean, especially in its native United Kingdom. There, other electronic subgenres, like grime, footwork and trap, have also been growing in popularity. Drumstep had continued its success while hardstyle had become mainstream in Australia and United States due to the success of music festivals, such as The Sound of Q-dance and Defqon 1. Grime experienced a resurgence beginning in 2014, initiated by the success of Meridian Dan's "German Whip" featuring Big H and Jme.

In Asia, popular music continued to be influenced by Western pop music. As with the past several decades, C-pop, J-pop and K-pop had continued to be successful in the Far East. In J-pop, image songs and the influence of anime on widespread music have grown since the late 2000s. K-pop's popularity continued to increase around the world throughout the decade and found wider recognition in Western markets. Media entertainment brand, Billboard, responsible for tabulating the Billboard Hot 100 and 200, inaugurated its own K-Pop chart and column presented weekly, on its Billboard.com site. The Billboard K-Town column, launched in 2013, continues to report on K-pop music; artists, concerts, chart information and news events. In 2015, the US iTunes store added a K-Pop genre category. Major streaming services such as Apple Music and Spotify both added K-pop categories to their repertoire to cater demand. In 2018, some K-pop artists from the Republic of Korea like Red Velvet even made a performance at the East Pyongyang Grand Theatre in the Democratic People's Republic of Korea. In India, Indian pop, rock, and filmi have continued to be mainstream. In the United Arab Emirates, Arabic pop, Arabic hip hop, rock and metal have continued in popularity.

Artists like Ed Sheeran, Adele, Ellie Goulding, Sam Smith, Jessie J, and Emeli Sandé from the U.K. started to become highly successful and gained popularity from crossover hits in the U.S. Ed Sheeran's "Shape of You", and "Perfect" and Adele's "Rolling in the Deep", "Someone Like You", and "Set Fire to the Rain" all reached the No.1 spot of the Billboard Hot 100 in this decade. Taio Cruz had also garnered successful hits. "Dynamite" and  "Break Your Heart" were successful singles with the latter reaching the top spot of the Billboard Hot 100.

North America

Pop 

Pop music had remained significantly popular due to dance-pop, electropop and synth-pop in this decade. Artists like Taylor Swift, Katy Perry, Ariana Grande, Kesha, Miley Cyrus, Selena Gomez, Justin Bieber, Adele and Lady Gaga were very popular and chart-topping pop songs this decade include Kesha's "", Britney Spears' "Hold It Against Me", Bruno Mars's "Just the Way You Are", Perry's "Firework", Gaga's "Born This Way", Adele's "Rolling in the Deep", Rihanna's "We Found Love", Swift's "Shake It Off", Bieber's "Sorry", Ed Sheeran's "Shape of You", Grande's "Thank U, Next", Billie Eilish's "Bad Guy", and Gomez's "Lose You to Love Me".

Dance-pop continued to be influenced by EDM with Justin Bieber's Purpose (2015) helping popularise Pop-drop in the mainstream along with fusing dance-pop with Tropical house and Future Bass EDM sub-genres. Popular songs like "Closer", "Shape of You", "Something Just like This", "Lean On", "Love Yourself", "Sorry", "I Took a Pill in Ibiza" and "Don't Let Me Down" were influenced by these genres. Taylor Swift's 1989 (2014) helped revive synth influences in pop with retro-futuristic pop growing in popularity in the late 2010s.

English-Irish pop boyband One Direction  and Canadian singer Shawn Mendes were some of the other acts that dominated the pop charts in the US this decade. Jonas Brothers made a comeback in 2019 and dominated the charts. Also from this decade were critically acclaimed works from Beyoncé, Lorde, Lana Del Rey, Taylor Swift, Kendrick Lamar, and Kanye West among others. New pop artists that emerged in that decade were Mike Posner, Ariana Grande, Halsey, Meghan Trainor, Bebe Rexha, Tori Kelly, Alessia Cara, Charlie Puth, Shawn Mendes, Julia Michaels, Maggie Rogers, Hailee Steinfeld, Lauv, Camila Cabello, Bazzi, Alec Benjamin, Billie Eilish, and Ava Max.

Teenage Dream, Katy Perry's sophomore album, released on August 24, 2010 spawned 5 consecutive number-one singles. It was the second album in history, to produce 5 number-one singles, the first by a woman to achieve this milestone. Those number-one singles were "California Gurls", "Teenage Dream", "Firework", "E.T.", and "Last Friday Night (T.G.I.F.)".

Rihanna earned the most #1 singles in the decade (nine), spending 41 weeks at the top of the chart, followed by Katy Perry with 8 #1 singles at a 26-week reign and Bruno Mars with 7 #1 singles leading 32 weeks. Justin Bieber and Taylor Swift both had five #1 singles this decade so far, Bieber spending 23 weeks at #1 and Swift with 18 weeks. Adele followed with four #1 singles at her name spending 24 weeks at the top. Kesha earned three #1 singles in this decade, spending 13 weeks at the top of the Billboard Hot 100. Among all those songs who reached #1 singles this decade "", "Rolling in the Deep", "Just the Way You Are", "Poker Face", "Shake It Off", and "Dark Horse" were some of the best-selling singles in the digital era.

Taylor Swift and Adele had some of the biggest-selling albums of the 2010s, being the only two artists to have sold more than a million copies of an album in a week, multiple times. Swift became the first artist in history to have four albums debut on the Billboard 200 with each selling over 1 million copies; they are: Speak Now (2010), Red (2012), 1989 (2014) and Reputation (2017); with Lover (2019), Swift became the first female artist to debut six albums on the chart, each opening with more than 500,000 copies. The American Music Awards crowned Swift as the Artist of the Decade, while Billboard named her the Woman of the Decade.

In this decade, Swift and Beyoncé became the only two female acts in history to achieve six consecutive number-one debuts on the Billboard 200 chart; Swift did it with Fearless (2008), Speak Now, Red, 1989, Reputation and Lover, while Beyoncé with Dangerously in Love (2003), B'Day (2006), I Am... Sasha Fierce (2008), 4 (2011), Beyoncé (2013) and Lemonade (2016).

Madonna became the first artist to achieve 50 number-one songs on any Billboard chart, in the Dance Club Songs chart, pulling ahead of runner-up, George Strait, who has 44 number-one songs on the Hot Country Songs chart.

Ariana Grande became the first solo artist to occupy the top three spots on the Billboard Hot 100 with "7 Rings" at number one, her third single "Break Up with Your Girlfriend, I'm Bored" debuting at number two, and her lead single "Thank U, Next" rose to number three, and the overall second artist to do so since the Beatles did in 1964 when they occupied the top five spots.

Comebacks were also made in the pop industry with acts such as the Backstreet Boys whose album DNA topped the Billboard Charts the week it was released.

Rock 

Rock had remained popular in the 2010s, despite having declined in chart presence since the late 2000s alongside changes in radio format. These changes were driven by the decline in compact discs and rise of downloads in the music industry, which prompted a focus on top 40 music. Rock had also moved from hard rock and heavy metal, which had dominated since the mid-1980s. Mainstream rock since the early 2010s had become softer and more refined because of indie rock. Rock was reportedly still the most widely consumed genre in the United States during 2014 and 2015. The decade had also seen the return of successful rock artists from the past, including AC/DC, David Bowie, Metallica, Stone Temple Pilots, Red Hot Chili Peppers, Pearl Jam, Nine Inch Nails, Soundgarden, Blink-182, Radiohead, Green Day, and Alice in Chains. All of these acts had albums debut within the top 5. In particular, English rock instrumentalist David Bowie experienced his most commercially successful period since the 1980s with two U.S. top 5 albums, The Next Day (2013) and Blackstar (2016), the latter being released shortly before his death.

Alternative rock 

Although its subgenre, indie rock, was in the spotlight during the 2010s, successful alternative rock bands in this decade were Imagine Dragons, Linkin Park, Muse, Coldplay, Foo Fighters, Weezer, Kasabian, Thirty Seconds To Mars, Kongos, Cage The Elephant, Evanescence, Metric, Nickelback, Arctic Monkeys, The Black Keys, Gorillaz, Red Hot Chili Peppers, Three Days Grace, The War On Drugs, Green Day, Pearl Jam, Queens Of The Stone Age, Panic! at the Disco, Kaleo, Fall Out Boy, Blink-182, Royal Blood, Twenty One Pilots, Radiohead, Jack Johnson, Death from Above 1979, Paramore, Biffy Clyro, Bring Me the Horizon and Nothing But Thieves. All of these bands had had albums debut in the top 5. With Fall Out Boy scoring 3 number 1 albums in a row on the Billboard 200 album chart in 2013, 2015, and 2018.

Psychedelic rock 
The decade had seen the revival of psychedelic rock as a popular subgenre for the first time since the 1970s. Bands of the decade had introduced synths and electronic sounds into the genre for the first time. Techniques seen in other genres such as Shoegaze were also employed to create walls of sound and distortion. Popular acts of the genre in the decade had been Animal Collective, Tame Impala, Unknown Mortal Orchestra, Mac DeMarco, The War on Drugs, Ariel Pink, Connan Mockasin, Homeshake, King Gizzard & the Lizard Wizard, Thee Oh Sees, Pond, Temples, MGMT, Allah-Las, Ty Segall, Samsara Blues Experiment and The Black Angels.

Progressive and experimental rock 

A huge renaissance in progressive rock occurred in the 2010s. One of the key forms of progressive music in the early 2010s was djent. It was influenced by mathematically driven metal from the previous decade, particularly Meshuggah. Guitarists such as Misha Mansoor, Justin Lowe, and Tosin Abasi made use of seven-string, eight-string, and nine-string guitars and mainly relied on polyrhythms, palm-muting, and syncopated guitar riffs, as well as melodic guitar solos. Some of the most popular and influential djent bands were Periphery, After the Burial, Animals as Leaders, Tesseract and Born of Osiris. Djent's popularity led to more bands including more mathematical elements in their music with it eventually leading to elements in mainstream pop music.

Another form of progressive rock in this decade was post-progressive, which drew influences from bands such as Radiohead and Porcupine Tree from the 2000s. This genre relies far more on simple melodic patterns combined with complex structure, texture and harmonies to create deep, emotionally driven, musical journeys in an effort to return the genre to its roots and make it relevant in the decade. Some newer progressive rock bands that were considered a part of this renaissance were Haken, Leprous, Riverside, Public Service Broadcasting, and iamthemorning. In addition, the 2010s also saw the return of some older artists including Opeth, Devin Townsend, Anathema, Pain of Salvation and Steven Wilson, who had a mainstream breakthrough with his studio albums Hand. Cannot. Erase. and To the Bone. In 2019, Tool experienced a major comeback with their first studio album in 13 years, Fear Inoculum.

In the later part of the decade, this revival led to progressive rock crossing over with an indie-and-metal approach which became popular. Many of these bands are diverse in sound, and are influenced by genres like post-hardcore, math rock, and post-rock music. Artists making successful albums were part of this genre, like Nothing More, Being as an Ocean, Circa Survive, Highly Suspect, Dredg, The Color Morale, Twelve Foot Ninja, The Mars Volta, Hands Like Houses, Code Orange, Sleepwave, Dayshell, Sworn in, Dead Letter Circus, Thank You Scientist, Turbowolf, Letlive, Marmozets, Black Map, Biffy Clyro, Night Verses, Thrice, The Word Alive, Dance Gavin Dance, Shining, Mutoid Man, Arcane Roots and A Perfect Circle.

Pop punk and punk rock 

With a few exceptions (including Green Day, The Offspring, Fall Out Boy, Paramore, Blink-182 and Panic! at the Disco), pop punk had heavily decreased in mainstream popularity during the 2010s and had not been enjoying popular success as it once did in the late 1990s and early 2000s. Emo, which had gained heavy widespread success between 2004 and 2008, had heavily declined in popularity by the early 2010s with the 2013 Breakup of My Chemical Romance being a likely factor of that. Early 1990s punk rock bands, like Bad Religion, NOFX, and Pennywise, had not had mainstream success since the 1990s or 2000s but still enjoyed heavy touring. Second wave pop punk acts, such as Good Charlotte, Sum 41, Simple Plan, and New Found Glory had heavily declined in popularity. However, DIY ethic punk rock had seen somewhat of a cult resurgence with bands, including Martha, The Spook School, Neck Deep, The Story So Far, and Joanna Gruesome, growing in popularity and being played on radio stations, like BBC Radio 6 Music. Garage punk bands such as Wavves, FIDLAR, PUP, Best Coast, The Growlers, Bass Drum of Death, The Garden, Ty Segall, Cherry Glazerr, and Thee Oh Sees had gained popularity, especially in Southern California. Many of these garage punk bands had signed to Burger Records, who are known for their DIY style ethos and releasing albums on cassette tape.

Hard rock and heavy metal 

During the 2010s, popular hard rock and heavy metal bands, such as Five Finger Death Punch, Avenged Sevenfold, Disturbed, Asking Alexandria, Breaking Benjamin, Slipknot, Shinedown, Bring Me the Horizon, A Day to Remember, Royal Blood, Ghost, Halestorm, Volbeat, Papa Roach, Chevelle, Black Veil Brides, Nothing More, Parkway Drive, Periphery, and Seether, had released successful albums. With many newer hard rock and heavy metal acts from this decade getting more success (especially with the streaming service success of progressive and experimental rock and metal music), the decade had also seen the return of older hard rock and heavy metal acts; some of which include bands that were previously on hiatus, or had not achieved mainstream popularity in years, like Soundgarden, Alice in Chains, Deftones, Metallica, Megadeth, Anthrax, Slayer, Testament, Exodus, Rush, Iron Maiden, Faith No More, Dream Theater and Metal Church. Guns N' Roses also experienced a major comeback during the mid-to-late 2010s with the Not in This Lifetime... Tour, which saw a reunion of three-fifths of their classic lineup (Axl Rose, Slash and Duff McKagan), all of whom last performed live together in 1993, and went on to become one of the highest-grossing tours of the decade.

Thrash metal was not as popular in the 2010s as it was during the 1980s and early-to-mid-1990s, when the genre declined in popularity, due to the rising success of grunge and alternative music. However, the decade had seen several veteran thrash metal bands continue to maintain considerable popularity in the United States, particularly on the Billboard 200 chart. Each of "the big four" of the genre (Metallica, Megadeth, Slayer and Anthrax) released albums that debuted on the top five or top ten on the Billboard 200, while other veteran thrash acts – including Testament, Overkill, Exodus, Metal Church and Death Angel – had achieved more greater success on the same chart. Newer bands associated with the "thrash metal revival movement" had also gained popularity throughout the 2010s, including Bonded by Blood, Evile, Gama Bomb, Havok, Municipal Waste, Power Trip, Suicidal Angels, Vektor and Warbringer.

The decade had also seen the revival of alternative metal, with two veteran Seattle acts Soundgarden and Alice in Chains cracking the top five on the Billboard 200 with their respective albums King Animal (2012) and The Devil Put Dinosaurs Here (2013); the latter's follow-up album Rainier Fog (2018) was also successful, debuting at number twelve on the Billboard 200, and at number one on Billboard's Top Rock Albums, Alternative Albums and Hard Rock Albums charts. In addition, some of the most successful alternative metal bands that were broken up in the 1990s or 2000s, such as Primus, Jane's Addiction, Faith No More, Helmet and Biohazard, released comeback albums in the 2010s. Other popular new "classic rock" themed hard rock bands had gained popularity later in the mid to late 2010s such as Greta Van Fleet, The Struts, and The Record Company.

Pop rock 

Although the fusion genre was not as popular as it was during the 1990s and early-to-mid-2000s, major pop rock acts in this decade included The Script, Train, OneRepublic, Maroon 5, Pink, Adam Lambert, Kelly Clarkson, 5 Seconds of Summer, Lady Gaga with the soundtrack of A Star Is Born and Avril Lavigne, while acts like The Fray and Daughtry had new lesser hits. Breakthrough acts included Bastille and Walk the Moon. Pop artists who rose in the 2010s who drew significantly on pop rock or rock included Alessia Cara, Billie Eilish, Halsey, and Lorde. Taylor Swift collaborated with alternative rock artists in the late 2010s and would enter the alternative rock charts in 2020.

Contemporary R&B and soul 

Contemporary R&B had not been as prominent in the early 2010s as it was from the late 1980s to the mid-2000s when new jack swing was a fixture in popular music. Slow jams had largely been replaced by dance numbers and pop ballads. Contemporary R&B had begun to influence hipster musicians, creating a new genre called alternative R&B. New players had emerged from this subgenre, like The Weeknd, Solange, Blood Orange, SZA, The Internet, Steve Lacy, Kali Uchis, Syd, How to Dress Well, Kilo Kish, Sampha, Lion Babe, Jhene Aiko, Normani, Frank Ocean, Ravyn Lenae, Kehlani, Tinashe, Sabrina Claudio, H.E.R., Tory Lanez, Gallant, Daniel Caesar, King, Moses Sumney, Kelela, dvsn, Jorja Smith, PartyNextDoor, Jeremih, Khalid, Bryson Tiller, Summer Walker, Giveon, and Ella Mai.

A few top mainstream contemporary R&B artists of the 2010s were Rihanna, Chris Brown, Usher, Beyoncé, Bruno Mars, Justin Timberlake, The Weeknd, Trey Songz, Miguel, Bryson Tiller, Alicia Keys, and John Legend. There was also a slight revival of soul during the early 2010s, with instrumentalists, such as CeeLo Green, Janelle Monáe, and Adele.

Due to the domination of electro and dance-pop, contemporary R&B had partially become more influenced by dance and electropop, and many musicians that were typically contemporary R&B artists had started to release pop. This is notable in players, including Ne-Yo, Usher, Chris Brown, and Rihanna with songs, like "Let Me Love You (Until You Learn to Love Yourself)" and "Forever Now," "Scream" and "OMG," "Don't Wake Me Up" and "Turn Up The Music," and "We Found Love" and "Where Have You Been." A form of R&B, dancehall, also became popular on the charts in the mid to late 2010s with songs such as "Lean On" by Major Lazer, "One Dance" by Drake, and Work by Rihanna.

There was also a resurgence of contemporary R&B acts from the 1990s and 2000s to achieve commercial success during the 2010s, such as Monica, Kelly Rowland, Brandy, Maxwell, D'Angelo, and Janet Jackson.

While some contemporary R&B artists transitioned to a more dance and electropop sound, many artists still achieved success while still remaining true to contemporary R&B. Songs, including "Everything to Me" by Monica, "Refill" by Elle Varner, "Thinking Bout You" by Frank Ocean, "Motivation" by Kelly Rowland, "Put It Down" by Brandy, and "No Sleeep" by Janet Jackson, are notable for being contemporary R&B and popular hits while still obtaining an authentic contemporary R&B sound.

Beyoncé became the first artist in Billboard chart history to have her first six albums debut at number-one on the Billboard 200 chart in 2016. Additionally, Beyoncé also became the first artist to place 12 tracks from one album within the Hot 100 simultaneously. Continuing her success from the 90s and 2000s, Beyoncé received the Billboard Millennium Award at the 2011 Billboard Music Awards, the Michael Jackson Video Vanguard Award at the 2014 MTV Video Music Awards, the Fashion Icon Award from the Council of Fashion Designers of America in 2016, and a Peabody Award for her universally acclaimed sixth studio album Lemonade in 2017. In 2016, Beyoncé surpassed Madonna as the most-awarded artist at the MTV Video Music Awards (24 wins). In 2018, her performance made history as the most watched live-streamed performance of all time, and was also called "historic" and dubbed the single best performance of all time by many newspapers.

The late 2010s had seen a resurgence of mainstream popularity in R&B, with albums such as 24K Magic by Bruno Mars, Heartbreak on a Full Moon by Chris Brown and songs such as "Redbone" by Childish Gambino and "Boo’d Up" by Ella Mai.

Hip hop 
On 17 July 2017, Forbes reported that hip-hop/R&B (which Nielsen SoundScan classifies as the same genre) had recently usurped rock as the most consumed musical genre, becoming the most popular genre in music for the first time in U.S. history.

A number of hip hop labels had also grown influential during this decade, among which had been Grand Hustle Records, GOOD Music, Cash Money Records, Roc Nation, Maybach Music Group, Top Dawg Entertainment, and Def Jam Recordings. Hip hop acts that were introduced to mainstream in the beginning of the decade included Drake,  Kendrick Lamar, J. Cole, Kid Cudi, Big Sean, Nicki Minaj, Meek Mill, Young Thug, ASAP Rocky, Wiz Khalifa, Tyler, The Creator, Azealia Banks, Future, Schoolboy Q, Wale, YG, 2 Chainz, Waka Flocka Flame, French Montana, Macklemore, Machine Gun Kelly, Chief Keef, and A$AP Ferg. Hip hop acts that were introduced to mainstream during mid-late part of the decade included Migos, Fetty Wap, Travis Scott, Post Malone, NF, G-Eazy, Logic, Lil Pump, Playboi Carti, Youngboy Never Broke Again, Yo Gotti, Cardi B, 21 Savage, Lil Uzi Vert, Lil Yachty, Rae Sremmurd, Mac Miller, Brockhampton, Kodak Black, XXXTentacion, Juice WRLD, Ugly God, Childish Gambino, Rich the Kid, Gunna, 6ix9ine, Blueface, BlocBoy JB, Lil Xan, NLE Choppa, DaBaby, Megan Thee Stallion, YBN Cordae, YBN Nahmir, Anderson Paak, Trippie Redd and more. Hip hop acts that started in previous decades, but continue to have commercial success in this decade include Kanye West, Eminem, Jay Z, Lil Wayne, DJ Khaled, Gucci Mane, Rick Ross, Jeezy and Pusha T. Hip hop acts that had never charted on the Billboard Hot 100 but still retain a strong fan base within the hip hop community at large have been Earl Sweatshirt, Princess Nokia, Joey Bada$$, Denzel Curry, Maxo Kream, Vince Staples, Divine Council, Isaiah Rashad, Action Bronson, and SpaceGhostPurrp. Hip hop acts that had gained fame via the social medium Vine were T-Wayne, iLoveMakonnen, Silento, Bobby Shmurda, Desiigner and iLoveMemphis.

Experimental hip hop artists such as Death Grips, JPEGMafia, and Clipping. have incorporated elements of experimental rock and industrial music into their sound, gaining notoriety in underground music circles and online. Kanye West's album Yeezus has been compared to this sound.

Mumble rap 
Mumble rap is a rap subgenre that originated on the online audio distribution platform SoundCloud. Most successful "SoundCloud rappers" might not release all their music on the platform opting instead for streaming services Apple Music and Spotify but are still categorized as "SoundCloud rappers" or "Internet"/"Underground rappers" due to their aesthetics, sonics, come up on the platform and collaborations with other rappers and producers in the scene. It is characterized as simplistic, bass heavy beats, often with hazy, lo-fi or shimmering sounding melodies or samples, paired with lyrics that ping-pong between braggadocio and nihilism, with lots of sex and odes to heavy narcotics. The subgenre began to start seeing mainstream popularity in the mid 2010s and takes sonic and aesthetic inspiration from the trap, drill, Cloud Rap, and internet rap scenes that began in the late 2000s and early 2010s on websites such as DatPiff and rap blogs with artists such as Gucci Mane, Lil B, Young Thug, Max B, Lil Ugly Mane, A$AP Mob, SpaceGhostPurrp and Chief Keef. The subgenre was met with some criticism for having less emphasis on lyricism, and the problematic nature of the artists to arise from it. Influential SoundCloud rappers include Kodak Black, Yung Bans, Lil Pump, Nav, Lil Uzi Vert, Travis Scott, Uno The Activist, Lil Yachty, Smokepurpp, ThouxanBanFauni, XXXTentacion, 21 Savage, 6ix9ine, Trippie Redd, Denzel Curry, Lucki, Warhol.ss, Maxo Kream, Young Nudy, Ugly God and Playboi Carti.

Trap 

Trap music is a style of Southern hip hop and gangsta rap that was developed in the late 1990s to early 2000s in the Southern United States. It is typified by double or triple-time sub-divided hi-hats, heavy, sub-bass layered kick drums from the Roland TR-808 drum machine, layered synthesizers and an overall dark, ominous or bleak atmosphere and lyrical content. The term "trap" referred to places where drug deals take place. In the 2010s, artists crossbred trap with dubstep to create trap EDM. It also influenced Latin trap music.

Prominent rappers of the trap music subgenre during the 2010s include Gucci Mane, Future, 2 Chainz, Migos, Young Thug, 21 Savage, Kodak Black, Cardi B, Nasty C and Lil Baby, among several others. Trap music during the 2010s also helped record producers rise to prominence such as Mike Will Made It, Lex Luger, Southside, Metro Boomin, London on da Track, Murda Beatz, and more.

Trap metal 
Trap metal (not to be confused with Nu Metal)  is a fusion genre that started in the 2010s, combining elements of trap music and heavy metal, as well as elements of other genres, like industrial and nu metal. It is characterized by distorted beats, hip hop flows, harsh vocals, and down tuned heavy metal guitars. British rapper Scarlxrd is often associated with the genre and is considered a pioneer of trap metal. WQHT described OG Maco's 2014 eponymous EP as being a part of the genre's early development. Other artists associated with trap metal include Dropout Kings, Bone Crew, Ghostemane, ZillaKami, Fever 333, Ho99o9, City Morgue, Kid Bookie, Rico Nasty, Kim Dracula, Backxwash, Denzel Curry, and $uicideboy$, as well as the early careers of XXXTentacion, 6ix9ine and Ski Mask the Slump God.

Emo Rap 
Emo rap is a fusion genre of hip hop and emo. Originating in the SoundCloud rap scene in the mid-2010s, the genre fuses characteristics of hip hop music, such as beats and rapping, with the lyrical themes, instrumentals, and vocals commonly found in emo music. XXXTentacion, Juice Wrld, and Lil Peep are some of the most notable musicians in the genre.What we can learn from the deaths of Juice WRLD, Lil Peep and XXXTentacion Emo rap departs from the "traditional" tones found in modern mainstream hip hop in favor of more emotional and personal lyrical content, described by the Wall Street Journal as "giving their elders the finger." Lyrics tend to focus on topics such as depression, loneliness, anxiety, drug abuse, nihilism, suicide, heartbreak, and self-medication. The genre is characterized by its combination of musical elements commonly found in conscious hip hop with indie rock instrumentals. Sampling often uses 2000s pop punk and emo songs.XXXTentacion, Lil Peep, and the Future of EmoThe sad new guard of emo rap Emo rap was pioneered by Bones, whose VHS-recorded music videos and dark production and aesthetic were so influential on the hip hop underground of the time that Dazed described him as the "underground rap king." In 2012, members of Thraxxhouse, a subgroup of Raider Klan, formed GothBoiClique (GBC), with the intention of drawing connections between the emo, trap, dark wave, black metal and indie rock scenes. GBC's style of emo rap influenced swathes of artists in the underground emo and hip hop scenes on SoundCloud, with Lil Lotus, Lil Peep and Lil Tracy, all citing the group as an influence and the latter-most two even eventually becoming members. During this time, a DIY ethos came to define the genre, to the extent that when Shinigami released his debut album Luna on Spotify, he was derided as a sellout, due to the streaming service's ability to monetize.Lil Tracy Will Not Be ErasedWicca Phase Springs Eternal: Occult Genre-Smasher Bred in Punk, Backed by Code Orange In November 2017, Lil Peep died of a Fentanyl overdose. Shortly afterwards, Lil Peep's debut studio album Come Over When You're Sober, Pt. 1 and the lead single "Awful Things" charted on the Billboard charts. His death brought increased notability to the genre as a whole and particularly to artists such as Trippie Redd and Lil Aaron. In June 2018, XXXTentacion was murdered, and like Peep, his albums 17 and ? charted the following week, along with his hit song "SAD!" charting at 1st on the Billboard Hot 100. In September 2018, a posthumous collaboration between the two artists, "Falling Down" was released and became certified Platinum in the US. The same year, emo rap was the fastest-growing genre on Spotify in 2018. In December 2019, Juice WRLD died after suffering a seizure, induced by an overdose of oxycodone and codeine. He was known to most people for the songs "All Girls Are the Same" and "Lucid Dreams", the latter peaked at number two on the Billboard Hot 100 in 2018 and returned to the chart in 2019 at number eight following his death.XXXTentacion Shot Dead at 20XXXTentacion Shot in the Neck During Murder, Seemingly Died Instantly

Alternative rap and Industrial Hip Hop 
Alternative hip hop is a hip hop subgenre that spans a wide range of genres that are not often associated with mainstream hip hop. Artists such as Clipping, Moor Mother, Dälek, M.I,A, Odd Future,  Death Grips, Freddie Gibbs, BROCKHAMPTON, JPEG MAFIA, Chance the Rapper and Earl Sweatshirt flooded with scene with critically acclaimed releases that are now hailed as modern classics. Death Grips' debut studio album, The Money Store, is their first step into the world of experimental hip hop. It's the follow-up to Exmilitary, their debut mixtape. The album was published on April 24, 2012, although it was leaked to YouTube on April 14, 2012. When The Money Store was first released, it earned a lot of positive press. "MC Ride, Andy Morin, and Zach Hill set out to produce an aggressive, stunning, ferocious racket and succeeded in spades," said music journalist Jim Carroll. Yeezus is the sixth studio album by American rapper and producer Kanye West. It was released on June 18, 2013, through Def Jam Recordings and Roc-A-Fella Records. West gathered a number of artists and close collaborators for the production, including Mike Dean, Daft Punk, Noah Goldstein, Arca, Hudson Mohawke, and Travis Scott. The album also features guest vocals from Justin Vernon, Chief Keef, Kid Cudi, Assassin, King L, Charlie Wilson, and Frank Ocean. It draws from an array of genres, including industrial, acid house, electro, punk, and Chicago drill. West's unconventional use of samples is also contained, as on "Blood on the Leaves", which contains a sample from Nina Simone's 1965 rendition of "Strange Fruit". Yeezus received widespread acclaim from critics, many of whom named it among West's best work and commended its brash direction, though public response was divided. The album was nominated for Best Rap Album at the 2014 Grammy Awards. The album debuted at number one on the US Billboard 200, selling 327,000 copies in the first week of release, while also topping the charts in Australia, Canada, Denmark, New Zealand, Russia and the United Kingdom. It has since been certified double platinum by the Recording Industry Association of America (RIAA), and was named by several publications as one of the best albums of the 2010s, including Rolling Stone, who later included it at 269 on its 2020 list of the 500 Greatest Albums of All Time.

Meme rap 
The term "meme rap" was first used to describe the work of Lil B, who released an impressive 64 mix tapes over the course of his career, earning him a dedicated online cult following. Due to his erratic lyrical subject matter and his focus on internet culture, he became a pioneer of meme rap.  following Lil B was a new wave of artists that were inspired by his comedic take on rap music such as Ugly God, Dbangz, Rich Brain, Pink Guy (Who would later become Joji), Bhad Bhabie, Yung Gravy and bbno$.

Jazzhop and Lofi Hip-Hop 
Lo-fi hip-hop emerged in the underground beatmaking hip-hop scene of the 2000s but reached peak popularity throughout the 2010's, particularly after the release of the Roland SP-303 and Roland SP-404 samplers, both of which included a separate button for the "lo-fi" effect. YouTube started hosting live streams in 2013, resulting in 24-hour "radio stations" dedicated to the subgenre. Compilation videos also became popular, combining the music with visuals that could take the form of recorded pedestrian walks through major cities like Tokyo, looping visuals from cartoons such as The Simpsons or Internet memes.

Electronic 

While dance music had periodically conquered the American pop charts, its current incursion had most likely been its deepest since the disco heyday of the 1970s. Throughout the 2010s, various electronic dance subgenres had conquered the music scene, such as house, dubstep, drumstep, hardstyle, electro house, techno, trance, synth-pop, electropop, and trap. These genres have many musical influences from 1970s' disco, 1980s' hi-NRG, spacesynth, Italo disco, and new wave, and 1990s' and 2000s' Eurodance, techno, house, trip hop, Europop, garage rock, and trance. The rise of electronic dance had brought massive success to large festivals, raves, technoparades, algoraves, doofs, and teknivals that mostly take place in the United States and Europe though every year thousands of electronic focused music festivals are held throughout the world. These events are also well known for their long association with the use of recreational drugs, including MDMA, LSD, 2C-B, Ketamine, and Benzylpiperazine. The top mainstream disk jockeys in the 2010s were Tiesto, David Guetta, Calvin Harris, Steve Aoki, Nicky Romero, Afrojack, Deadmau5, Diplo, Skrillex, Armin Van Buuren, Avicii, Zedd, Martin Garrix, Hardwell, The Chainsmokers, Marshmello, Major Lazer, DJ Snake, Slushii, and Disclosure.

Hyperpop 
A loosely defined musical style and queer microgenre known as hyperpop was born in the UK in the early 2010s. Artists in this genre generally combine pop and avant-garde sensibilities while relying on themes found in electronic, hip hop, and dance music. It is distinguished by a maximalist or exaggerated take on popular music.  Hyperpop typically uses elements like brash synth melodies, Auto-Tuned "earworm" vocals, excessive compression, and distortion, as well as surrealist or nostalgic allusions to 2000s Internet culture and the Web 2.0 era. Hyperpop reflects an exaggerated, eclectic, and self-referential approach to pop music. [4] Heavy processing of the voice, metallic, melodic percussion, pitch-shifted synths, catchy choruses, brief song lengths, and "shiny, cutesy aesthetics" contrasted with angst-filled lyrics are common characteristics. [4] Mark Richardson of The Wall Street Journal described the genre as escalating the "tropes of popular music that are "artificial," creating "a cartoonish wall of noise that embraces catchy rhythms and memorable hooks. As shimmering melodies and jumbled instrumentation combine, the music veers between the beautiful and the ugly."

Indie

Indie Folk 
Indie Folk is an amalgamation of independent American music formed by the diverse traditions that comprise the musical ethos of the United States, particularly sounds that emerged from the Southern United States such as folk, gospel, blues and other external influences. Artists such as The Lumineers, Mumford and sons, Bon Iver, phoebe bridgers and Sufjan Stevens became mainstream successes  because of there organic instrumentation and roosty production style.

Bedroom Pop 
Dreamy, nostalgic music produced from the homes of young, independent artists became hugely popular in the late 2010s, particularly online. The term "bedroom pop" was popularized by Spotify to describe Indie Pop music with lofi production, Dream pop inspired guitar tones, vintage synthesizers and most importantly pop music song structures.  Mac Demarco helped popularize this style, especially his 2012 studio album 2 which was not only a critical success but a commercial success laying the groundwork for various other dreamy lofi inspired indie acts. Rex Orange County released Apricot Princess April 26, 2017 to widespread aclaim the in the indie music scene. Clairo appeared on the scene with her smash hit songs Pretty Girl, 4EVER and Flaming Hot Cheetos to wide spread acclaim and become an overnight sensation,  she was particularly praised for her nostalgic synth pop sound and her dream-like lo-fi aesthetic.   Other artists that were popular at the time include Still Woozy, Boy Pablo, Beabadoobee, Kenny Beats, Gus Dapperton, DayGlow, Cuco and Left at London. Bedroom pop allowed for the expression of unapologetically LGBTQ+ themes in the alternative music spheres, specifically Girl In Red and CaveTown.

Latinx Indie Pop 
Artists such as Kali Uchis, The Marias, Mon Laferte, Cuco, Omar Apollo and various other artists continued innovating the Indie landscape with there songwriting and iconic hazy Lo-fi production styles. Dream Pop guitars, Psychedelic synthesizers and the use of 80's drum machines were the go to production choices for many Latin artists in the late 2010's. Not only did these artists help create the genre Bedroom Pop but they also changed the entire indie pop landscape in the United States.

Country 

Country had continued to maintain its popularity both as a radio format and in retail; this is attributed both to the faithfulness of country fans and to a rise in popularity of the genre. The most popular country acts during this decade were Taylor Swift, Zac Brown Band, Carrie Underwood, Miranda Lambert, Jason Aldean, The Band Perry, Keith Urban, Luke Bryan, Blake Shelton, Lady Antebellum, Tim McGraw, George Strait, Toby Keith, Kenny Chesney, Florida Georgia Line, Brantley Gilbert, Eric Church, Dierks Bentley, Brad Paisley, Thomas Rhett, Cole Swindell, Rascal Flatts, Kacey Musgraves, Jake Owen, Dustin Lynch, Kip Moore, Little Big Town, Chris Young, Hunter Hayes, Cam, Sam Hunt, Lee Brice, Eli Young Band, Darius Rucker, Randy Houser, Kelsea Ballerini, Maren Morris, Billy Currington, Tyler Farr, Brett Eldredge, Sturgill Simpson, Chris Stapleton, Luke Combs, Kane Brown, and Brett Young.

A large number of duos and vocal groups had begun to emerge on the charts during the 2010s, many of which feature close harmony in the lead vocals, a style that roots as far back as the 1940s and 1950s with acts, like The Shelton Brothers, Delmore Brothers, and Everly Brothers. It saw a resurgence in the 1980s with The Judds and The Bellamy Brothers although the more recent acts tend to not be related. Examples of successful duos were Florida Georgia Line, Love and Theft, Dan + Shay, The Howboy Catts, and Thompson Square. In addition to Lady Antebellum, bands, such as The Band Perry, Gloriana, Eli Young Band, and Zac Brown Band had come to occupy a large portion of the new, popular country players. Meanwhile, artists who began their careers as far back as the 1960s and 1970s had continued to be active, including Willie Nelson, Dolly Parton, Loretta Lynn, Kenny Rogers, Alabama, The Oak Ridge Boys, George Strait, and Reba McEntire.

In September 2016, "Forever Country," a medley of three classic country songs – "Take Me Home, Country Roads," "On the Road Again" and "I Will Always Love You"—was recorded to honor the 50th Annual Country Music Association Awards. A celebration of traditional country music and the genre's ongoing popularity, the song blended together 30 stars, ranging from newcomers to veteran to classic stars and acts of the genre. A similar medley, featuring many of the same stars that performed on "Forever Country" but with different songs, was performed at the CMA Awards. Both performances received widespread critical acclaim.

Hip hop's influence on country 

Several popular country songs have taken influence from 21st-century hip hop, rock, and pop and have had themes of partying, attractive young women, blue jeans, Southern rock, and pickup trucks. These characteristics are typical in an unofficial subgenre known as bro-country. Instrumentalists embracing this trend were Jason Aldean, Luke Bryan, Eric Church, Florida Georgia Line, Brantley Gilbert, and several others, with songs, like "Cruise," "That's My Kind of Night," and Blake Shelton's "Boys 'Round Here" having been the most widespread songs in terms of sales and downloads. While many of the themes of bro-country songs -– in particular, women and alcohol –- have always been a part of country music (particularly since the rise of honky tonk styles in the 1940s), the new genre came under fire by listeners, music reviewers, and classic country musicians such as Alan Jackson and Gary Allan, and was satirized in the song "Girl in a Country Song" by the duo Maddie & Tae. The shifting styles also played a role in a brief feud between Shelton and country legend Ray Price in 2013, just months before Price's death, after Shelton remarked that "Nobody wants to listen to their grandpa's music" and that younger consumers weren't buying or downloading classic country music because the styles and sounds of songs from the past didn't appeal to them. Price –- who, unlike several of his peers, usually kept quiet in the debate on classic country vs. more modern music –- expressed his disapproval via his Facebook page, stating that it was their styles and success that helped make newer stars' careers possible and paved the way to modern country music. Shelton later retracted his statement, and Price accepted his apology.

In March 2019, the song "Old Town Road," a song performed by American rap artist Lil Nas X (born Montero Hill), began gaining popularity with country music fans, particularly after a remix of the song featuring vocals by Billy Ray Cyrus was released earlier in the year. The song combined elements of country rap, hip hop, Southern hip hop and trap, and used themes of horseback riding and culture clash with urban America in its lyrics. The song became the first to chart on all three of the major Billboard charts – Hot 100, Hot R&B/Hip-Hop Songs and Hot Country Songs – in nearly 60 years, charting at No. 19 on the country chart. However, one week after its debut on the country chart, Billboard removed the song from the chart, disqualifying the song on the grounds that it did not fit the country genre. There was speculation that had the song remained on the chart, it would have reached No. 1 as of the chart dated April 6, 2019. Later in 2019, hip-hop music producer Blanco Brown recorded and released "The Git Up," which was called a "sequel" and "next viral country rap song".

The rise in use and influence of elements of hip-hop music and related styles in country music – as seen in both the "bro-country" and trap country movements – as well as issues related to Shelton's comments and continued popularity of country pop – once again sparked the longstanding debate over what defines "real" country music, an issue that has recurred since the 1970s.

Tragedy and deaths of classic stars 

The decade had also seen death and tragedy in country. Mindy McCready, a rising star of the late 1990s whose personal problems soon overshadowed her music, committed suicide during early 2013. Glen Campbell, a vastly influential country guitarist and vocalist from the 1960s onward, was diagnosed with Alzheimer's disease in late 2010 and consequently retired from show business in 2013; he died in 2017. Randy Travis, a neo-traditionalist star who helped revive the genre in the mid-to-late 1980s, had several run-ins with the law in 2012 and in 2013 suffered a massive stroke. Troy Gentry of Montgomery Gentry, one of the genre's most popular duos, was killed in a helicopter crash in 2017. Also in 2017, 58 concertgoers at the Route 91 Harvest festival event in Las Vegas, Nevada – where Jason Aldean was performing at the time gunfire broke out – were killed in a mass shooting; Aldean escaped the incident uninjured and a week later paid tribute to the victims on Saturday Night Live.

Prominent classic country players who had died during the decade, besides Glen Campbell, were Carl Smith, Jimmy Dean, Ferlin Husky, Kitty Wells, Patti Page, Jack Greene, Slim Whitman, George Jones, Ray Price, Little Jimmy Dickens, Lynn Anderson, Jim Ed Brown, Sonny James, Merle Haggard, Jean Shepard, Don Williams, Mel Tillis, Freddie Hart, Roy Clark, Dave Rowland (lead singer of the 1970s trio Dave and Sugar), Earl Thomas Conley and all three of the Glaser Brothers (Tompall in 2013, and brothers Jim and Chuck in 2019). Besides Mindy McCready and Troy Gentry, several performers from the late 1980s, 1990s and later who were popular with audiences also died: Kevin Sharp, Holly Dunn, Lari White and Daryle Singletary. Also, Glenn Frey, a member of Eagles, a rock band whose style has been vastly influential in country from the 1970s onward, died during the decade. Additionally, longtime radio personality Bob Kingsley, who presented many of the above-mentioned classic artists' songs during his tenures hosting the radio programs American Country Countdown and Bob Kingsley's Country Top 40, died in the fall of 2019, shortly after revealing his diagnosis of cancer.

Christian 

Christian music saw a rise in success during the early 2010s, with several artists debuting within the top 5 on the Billboard 200. In 2011, the Christian instrumentalists Casting Crowns and Red both debuted at number 2 on the Billboard 200, with their respective albums Come to the Well and Until We Have Faces. David Crowder Band also reached number 2 with Give Us Rest during 2012. Today's Christian Music reported that Passion: White Flag, a live album of the performances of various musicians at the 2012 Passion Conference, debuted at number 5 on the Billboard 200. On 28 August 2012, the TobyMac album Eye on It debuted at number 1 on that chart, the first Christian album since 1997 and third overall to do so. The very next week, Christian hip hop artist Lecrae debuted at number 3 on the Billboard 200 with Gravity. Additionally, both the number 1 and 2 spots on the iTunes hip hop charts were taken by the deluxe and standard versions of the album. The commercial reception of Gravity was called "easily the biggest sales week ever for a Christian rap album." In January 2013, Chris Tomlin became the fourth Christian player to top the Billboard 200 with his seventh studio album Burning Lights. 73,000 units were sold in its debut week. Lecrae then topped the Billboard 200 during September 2014 with his album Anomaly, selling 88,000 units in its debut week. This not only established Lecrae as the fifth artist to top the chart, but it also marked the first time that an artist reached number 1 on both the Billboard 200 and Top Gospel charts. Following – and partially due to – Lecrae's peak on the Gospel chart, Billboard revised its standards for the chart, rendering most hip hop releases ineligible.

The success of TobyMac and Lecrae prompted an article in Time that examined the recent upsurge in crossover success of Christian instrumentalists. The magazine referred to Rod Riley of Word Entertainment as an indication that all of these successes could "be the tip of the iceberg." Riley had cited the increasing talent of Christian musicians and the ownership of all major Christian record labels by widespread parents as a reason for the success of Christian. According to Time, TobyMac and the rock band Skillet had been featured in NFL telecasts, TobyMac's music was also listed by Time as a factor in the rise of Christian. Producer Mark Joseph claimed in an article by Fox News that TobyMac reaching number 1 was just one more example of the mainstreaming of "'so-called Christian music that his [sic] happening all around us'". He further stated that "'the pop and rock charts are filled with artists who used to be in that industry like Katy Perry, Switchfoot and Joy Williams of The Civil Wars, but also by young devout performers who in the past might have gone into that industry, like Justin Bieber, Mumford & Sons, The Fray, Cold War Kids and Twenty One Pilots.'" Following Lecrae's performance on BET and appearance on Statik Selektah's Population Control, in Chad Horton, co-owner of the website Rapzilla, stated that "Christian hip hop" had-in the past two years-"pushed into the mainstream more than ever before," and citing part of its cause as better music quality presentation than "any other time before" in January 2012.

Europe

Rock 

Alternative rock had experienced a modest presence in the United Kingdom singles chart during the 2010s, mostly from artists originating in the previous decade, including Kasabian, Arctic Monkeys, Gorillaz, Coldplay, The Wombats, Muse, Mumford & Sons, and Snow Patrol. Bands like Two Door Cinema Club, Foals, and Bombay Bicycle Club, which emerged in the late 2000s, had succeeded in the album chart. The genre had had a stronger presence album-wise, with acts such as The 1975, Bastille, alt-J, and The Vaccines enjoying success. Bastille had scored two number 2 singles on the UK chart, with their sound bordering on mainstream pop music in the charts. Royal Blood was the first band formed during the decade to win a Brit Award for the best British group in 2014, only one year after forming. Royal Blood's sound is similar to 2000s garage rock, and they received positive reviews upon the release of their debut album.

European rock had also seen the return of successful instrumentalists from the past. David Bowie-in particular had two UK number 1 albums—The Next Day and Blackstar. Upon its release, The Next Day (2013) became Bowie's most successful album in 30 years, followed by Blackstar (2016).

Acts, including Tribes, White Lies, The Maccabees, Miles Kane and Hard-Fi, had also witnessed success, mostly exclusive to the album chart.

Heavy metal and hard rock had been seeing a relatively increased presence in the UK albums chart, thanks to releases by Bullet For My Valentine and Enter Shikari. Many new British heavy metal bands are seeing worldwide success after years of American dominance, primarily Bring Me the Horizon and Asking Alexandria, although the latter entirely moved to the U.S. in 2009. There was also a resurgence of the German metal scene from the 1980s to achieve commercial success during the 2010s, with bands like Accept and Kreator achieving their first number one albums on the German charts.

A grassroots punk scene continued in the UK, mainly built around the hub of the annual Rebellion Festival in Blackpool. The 2010s saw a particular profusion of younger female or female-fronted bands affiliated to the punk scene.

In northern Europe, especially Sweden, 1980s glam metal had seen something of a revival from acts like Hardcore Superstar, Crazy Lixx, Crashdïet, H.E.A.T, and Reckless Love. Sweden's Sabaton had also been successful, as had the Finnish symphonic metal band Nightwish.

In eastern Europe, acts like Repetitor, Vizija, Bernays Propaganda, ZAA and Artan Lili become successful with their experimenting in the music.

Folk 
Folk witnessed a large growth during the early 2010s in the UK. The most widespread British folk musician was Mumford & Sons, who won a 2011 Brit Award for "Best Album" and had enjoyed commercial success in both Europe and North America. Another notable player and winner of "Best British Female" at the 2011 BRIT Awards was Laura Marling. Other successful acts were Ed Sheeran, George Ezra, James Bay, Jake Bugg, Johnny Flynn, Noah and the Whale, Bon Iver, Ben Howard, and Alessi's Ark.

Pop 

Contemporary R&B, as well as classic soul, had defined much of the UK's mainstream music in the early to mid-2010s. Notable artists who encompass this sound include Jessie J and Adele. As with previous decades, pop had enjoyed chart domination, with popular instrumentalists, such as Cher Lloyd, Birdy, Jessie Ware, James Blunt, Sam Smith, Rag'n'Bone Man, Calum Scott, Lily Allen, Clean Bandit, Rixton, Disclosure, La Roux, Shura, AlunaGeorge, James Blake, Róisín Murphy, Olly Murs, M.I.A., London Grammar, FKA Twigs, Jamie xx, The xx, Ed Sheeran, Rita Ora, Zayn Malik, Chvrches, Years & Years, Charli XCX, Ava Max, Dua Lipa, Jay Sean, Paloma Faith, Emeli Sandé, Florence and the Machine, Cheryl Cole, The Saturdays, Ellie Goulding, Marina and the Diamonds, and Katy B. Teen pop boy bands-despite being unpopular for much of the 2000s-had returned to widespread popularity, with acts, including One Direction and The Wanted, having seen major commercial success worldwide. French singer Zaz was one of very few singers to have become internationally mainstream since Vanessa Paradis. The girlbands also had success, one of them being the winners of the eighth season of The X Factor, Little Mix, who are credited for helping the girl band renaissance in the UK during the late 00s and into the early 10s.

Legendary British band Take That remained very popular, alongside its former member Robbie Williams, who released successful albums and singles.

Soul 

English singer-songwriter Adele, after releasing her debut album in 2008, rose to global superstardom with the release of her second studio album 21 (2011), which topped the charts in over 30 countries and became one of the biggest selling albums of all-time as well as the best selling album of the 21st century. Her third album 25 (2015), attained even further success, debuting at number one in 32 countries and became the fastest selling album of all-time.

Electronic 
Dubstep and drumstep started to become popular by 2010. This was particularly true in Britain, where it evolved from UK Garage, a genre that became widespread during the early 2000s. DJ Snake is known for having introduced trap into the mainstream in Europe during 2013. Eurodance-which has been consistently popular in Europe since the early 1990s-had become popular outside Europe, in a more modern style than the first wave into North America in the 1980s and early 1990s. The emergence and commercial success of Dutch house and the associated 'big room' house style had also brought electronic musicians from the continent to the global forefront. In the mid-2010s, further development of house subgenres had been seen in the creations of future house and tropical house, with European players being influential figures within both. Prominent European disk jockeys during this decade were Avicii, Martin Garrix, Nicky Romero, Tiesto, Dimitri Vegas & Like Mike, Afrojack, Kygo, Calvin Harris, and David Guetta.

2014 saw the beginning of a grime revival in the UK, initiated by the success of Meridian Dan's "German Whip" featuring Big H and Jme. The song reached number 13 in the UK Singles Charts. Two months after that, Skepta reached number 21 in the UK Singles Chart with his single "That's Not Me" featuring his brother Jme. Two months later, Lethal Bizzle released the single "Rari WorkOut" featuring Jme and Tempa T, which also charted, peaking at number 11 in the UK Singles Charts. A wave of new successful young grime MC's also began to emerge, such as Stormzy, AJ Tracey, Novelist, Jammz, and Lady Leshurr.

Oceania

Pop 

Mainstream music by Australian artists had tended to be influenced by radio broadcasting more than any other country. Australian radio station Triple J had played a large role in promoting new Australian music, especially through the Triple J Hottest 100, a worldwide public poll on each individual's favourite music from each given year. During 2010, Australian pop instrumentalists to feature substantially in the countdown were Birds of Tokyo, Pendulum, Washington, and Triple J Unearthed group Gypsy & The Cat. Australian acts that were placed high on the countdown were Angus & Julia Stone, Little Red, Art vs. Science, Sia, and The Jezabels. The correlation between the Triple J Hottest 100, the ARIA singles chart, and iTunes singles chart had been distinctly evident. The number one song of 2010, "Big Jet Plane," reached number 6 on the iTunes singles chart and number 32 on the ARIA singles chart, the week following the announcement of the Hottest 100 on 26 January. In 2014, Iggy Azalea started to make hits on music charts worldwide, sparking a trend for female rappers. Sia had become one of the most famous Australian artists, since the release of "Titanium", to later become successful with her solo work, with the viral "Chandelier" music video.

During 2011, Australian musicians to feature substantially in the Hottest 100 countdown were Boy & Bear, Gotye, 360, Architecture in Helsinki, and Ball Park Music. Again, the correlation between the Hottest 100 and the growth of singles on the ARIA and iTunes singles charts in the week following was strong. Rapper 360 and his song, "Boys Like You," entered the Hottest 100 at number 8, and the following week, it rose to number 2 on the iTunes singles chart and number 3 on the ARIA singles chart. A similar movement included Matt Corby's       "Brother"-number 3 in the 2011 Hottest 100 countdown-also rising to number three on the ARIA charts. The most prominent Australian song during 2011 and early 2012 was Gotye's "Somebody That I Used To Know" which reached number 1 in 11 countries, including Australia, New Zealand, Germany, Austria, Belgium, Canada, the United States and the United Kingdom. The song also reached number 1 on the Triple J Hottest 100 of 2011 countdown and featured New Zealander pop singer, Kimbra, who also placed three times on the Triple J Hottest 100 as a solo artist.

Electropop 
Electropop in Australia had been dominated by the use of synthesizers and Auto-Tune, which became popular because of newcomers, like Havana Brown, Elen Levon, Timomatic, and Justice Crew, as well as 2000s players, such as Brian McFadden, Zoe Badwi, Natalie Bassingthwaighte, Sneaky Sound System, and The Potbelleez. The most successful songs of this subgenre have been Brown's "We Run the Night," Timomatic's "Set It Off," Justice Crew's "Friday to Sunday," McFadden's "Just Say So," and Badwi's "Freefallin'."

Contemporary R&B 
Contemporary R&B in Australia was not as widespread in the early 2010s as it was in the 2000s; however, artists, including Guy Sebastian, Jessica Mauboy, and Stan Walker, continued to produce music that was commercially successful. During 2010, Sebastian's single, "Who's That Girl," featuring American rapper Eve, reached number 1 on the ARIA Singles Chart and became his fifth number 1 single in Australia. This made him the only Australian male instrumentalist in Australian music history to achieve five number 1 singles. Mauboy had released many commercially successful top 20 singles, like "Saturday Night" featuring American rapper Ludacris, "What Happened to Us" featuring English musician Jay Sean, and "Galaxy" with Walker, all of which have been certified platinum. In August 2010, Walker's second album entitled From the Inside Out was released; it debuted at number 2 on the ARIA Albums chart.

Hardstyle 
Hardstyle had become more mainstream in Australia, with events, such as "Defqon 1," HSU, Powerhouse Events & "IQON," by Q-dance. Australian hardstyle players have been Code Black, Toneshifterz, Audiofreq, Kamikaze, Outbreak, and Rebourne.

Future garage and Australian sound 
This fluid and not completely defined subgenre emerged in 2009. Artists embracing it were Flume, Hayden James, Ta-ku, Chet Faker, and Emoh Instead.

Metalcore and hardcore punk
Following the success of Australian metalcore band Parkway Drive in the late 2000s and early 2010s, band's such as Northlane were formed and were successful in the early 2010s despite the global decline in the popularity of metalcore. In the mid-and-late 2010s Australia saw an increase in Metalcore and Hardcore Punk bands as part of the hardcore revival, with new young bands such as Polaris, Thornhill, and Alpha Wolf coming onto the scene. The lyrical themes in Australian metalcore often include topics such as social justice and eco-socialism. Australian metalcore regularly incorporates aspects of EDM or Dubstep. Australia's metalcore scene is supported by the public access radio station triple-J, a trend that is not seen in most other scenes, as well as Australia's yearly Hard Rock festival unify gathering.

Latin America and Caribbean

Pop and reggaeton 

In Latin America, pop, pop rock, El Pasito Duranguense, and tropical were still mainstream through the early 2010s. A new electro subgenre emerged from reggaeton, and it became popular during late 2010. This is because of electronic and dance being widespread in the prominent markets of the world. Pitbull has been the principal representative of this subgenre. Bachata – which became mainstream in the past decade – has garnered more popularity thanks to remakes of classic songs, including "Stand by Me" by Prince Royce and "Will You Still Love Me Tomorrow" by Leslie Grace. In addition, acts, like Royce, as well as former Aventura lead singer Romeo Santos, had crossed over different markets with bachata, such as with Enrique Iglesias' song Loco, which features Santos. Royce and Santos had the best selling Latin albums of 2011 and 2012, respectively, in the United States with their debut albums-Prince Royce and Formula, Vol. 1. Salsa However, it declined later in the early 2010s although Marc Anthony made an international hit with his salsa song "Vivir Mi Vida."

In 2017 the Luis Fonsi song featuring Daddy Yankee, "Despacito" was a hit, topping the charts of 47 countries and tying for the longest-reigning number-one single Billboard'''s history. Since her debut in 2003, Natalia Lafourcade has been one of the most successful singers in the pop rock scene in Latin America. Foreign pop artists have had success in Mexico. In May 2013, Christina Aguilera appeared on Mexican singer Alejandro Fernández's cover of "Hoy Tengo Ganas de Ti" from his album Confidencias. On September 24, 2015 Mexican singer-songwriter Carla Morrison becomes the first female soloist in 22 weeks to enter the top 10 of Billboard Latin Digital Songs chart. "Hasta la Raíz" by Natalia Lafourcade wins Song of the Year and Record of the Year at the 16th Annual Latin Grammy Awards. ¡México Por Siempre! by Mexican singer Luis Miguel wins Best Regional Mexican Music Album at the 61st Annual Grammy Awards. "Me Niego" by Reik featuring Ozuna and Wisin wins Song of the Year and Collaboration of the Year at the Premio Lo Nuestro 2019. "Mi Persona Favorita" by Alejandro Sanz and Camila Cabello wins Record of the Year at the 20th Annual Latin Grammy Awards. Los Ángeles Azules featuring Natalia Lafourcade song "Nunca Es Suficiente" was the 10 Most-streamed songs for Latin music in the United States in 2019.

In addition to Enrique Iglesias having a successful decade with his albums 'Euphoria' and 'Sex And Love', Latin veteran Ricky Martin enjoyed massive popularity with his albums 'Musica + Alma + Sexo' and 'A Quién Quiera Escuchar' and non-album singles 'Vida', 'Mr. Put It Down' featuring Pitbull, 'Vente Pa'Ca' featuring Maluma, 'Fiebre' featuring Wisin & Yandel, as well as 'Cantalo' featuring Residente and Bad Bunny which is the lead single of his 2020 EP 'Pausa'.

 Hip hop 

US rapper Nicki Minaj became extremely popular during the early 2010s. Minaj's debut studio album, Pink Friday (2010) peaked at number 1 on the Billboard 200 a month after its release, selling 375,000 copies in its first week. This marked the second highest sales week for a female hip hop recording artist, behind Lauryn Hill's The Miseducation of Lauryn Hill in 1998, which sold 422,624 copies in its first week. She became the first female solo artist to have seven singles on the Billboard Hot 100 at the same time. Her seventh single, "Super Bass," has been certified Diamond by the RIAA, becoming one of the best selling singles in the United States. Minaj's second studio album, Pink Friday: Roman Reloaded (2012,) topped charts internationally, also spawning the top 10 singles "Starships" and "Pound the Alarm." The album became one of the best selling albums of 2012, according to Nielsen SoundScan, selling 1 million copies worldwide, as well as "Starships" becoming one of the best selling singles of that year. She was the first female artist included on MTV's Annual Hottest MC List, with The New York Times suggesting that some consider her "the most influential female rapper of all time."

 Asia 

 K-pop 

During the early 2010s, the K-pop genre began to noticeably increase its popularity outside Asia, spreading into Eastern Europe, Latin America, the Middle East, and the West at an exponential rate compared to the previous decade. The Internet served a dominant role in K-pop's rise in popularity, establishing diverse fan communities online, likening it to a netizen sub-culture.

In Southeast Asia, K-pop continued to increase its presence in the lexicon of Asia's popular culture, being known as part of a wider brand of exported Korean Entertainment named Hallyu. Outside Asia, social media and video sharing sites such as YouTube, Facebook, Tumblr, Reddit and Twitter had a significant influence in promulgating awareness of Korean pop to new western audiences. Shareable, high-production value music videos, eye-catching fashion and slick choreographies paired with music influenced by western pop trends helped establish K-pop as an intriguing online spectacle. The genre proved it could convert viral success into commercial success in 2012, when Psy's "Gangnam Style" became a breakout viral hit topping the music charts of more than 30 countries including Australia, Canada, France, Germany, Italy, Russia, Spain, and the United Kingdom as well as No.2 in the United States.

Globalisation had afforded K-pop groups continued expansion into the Western markets, most notably the United States, through tours, online downloads and streaming services like Spotify and Apple Music, who added more K-pop to their libraries in response to increased demand from K-fans. Korean girl group 2NE1 and boy groups Exo and BTS all charted within the top half of the Billboard 200 albums chart with Korean-language albums in the 2010s. These albums, although recorded in Korean, incorporated English-language phrases and slang terms into their lyrics and used popular western music trends of the time such as hip-hop, R&B, EDM, tropical house, deep house and trap music to their benefit. Similar to the bubblegum pop groups of the 1990s, K-pop occupies a predominantly youth demographic despite the language barrier. Leading K-pop acts were Girls' Generation, 2NE1, Big Bang, Super Junior, Psy, Exo, BTS, Wonder Girls, Blackpink, Twice, and Red Velvet. Despite advancements in the visibility of the genre, K-pop was yet to fully establish and solidify a Korean "East-to-West" crossover act within the global music industry, this being the dream goal of many Korean entertainment companies.

Domestically, young Korean Indie acts K-Indie as well as Korean Urban contemporary acts rose to higher prominence than ever before. The influence of North American pop and hip-hop culture remained visible through young Korean artists as K-Hip-hop and K-R&B emerged from the underground and discovered newfound commercial viability on Korea TV and Radio as well as domestic music streaming services.

 J-pop 

During 2010, the prominent Japanese female idol group AKB48 received a Guinness World Record for being the world's "largest pop group."

In 2010, the Japanese boy band, Arashi, released their 1 million selling album Boku no Miteiru Fūkei, which was named the best selling album of the year in Japan.

 C-pop 

Indie pop and rock music continued to have a dominant effect on radio stations in Taiwan and Hong Kong. Jay Chou was still the dominant force in Asian popular music, with his new album The Era nominated for six Golden Melody Awards (of which it won three) and its lead single "Superman can't fly" hitting #2 on the Hit FM charts that year.

S.H.E member Hebe Tien had her first solo hit with "A little happiness", which became the theme song of Taiwanese movie Our Times in 2015.

In 2013, the three-member boy band TFBoys was established. They were known for their bubblegum-style music and choreography, such as that seen in the music video of their signature song, "Manual of Youth".

While in Hong Kong and Taiwan pop music and pop-rock music were dominant, straight-ahead jazz, jazz fusion, and classical music continued to be the most popular genres among young Singaporean musicians, especially bands.

The youthful Orchestra of the Music Makers, which took its name from a line from the poem by Arthur O'Shaughnessy, was the most popular youth orchestra in the region in the first half of the decade, and released their first solo album of works by Gustav Mahler in 2013.

 Hip hop 
Sơn Tùng M-TP was one of the most successful pop star in Southeast Asia, his songs such as "Run Now" ("Chạy ngay đi") and "Give It to Me" ("Hãy trao cho anh") featuring Snoop Dogg have achieved global success. His music is considered to represent V-pop.

Rapper Shigga Shay was one of the most successful rapper in Southeast Asia, scoring a hit with his rap remake of an old Malay folk song.

 Africa 

 Electropop and rock

By the late 2000s and early 2010s, South Africa began a great phase of high music experimentation of genres previously not very prominent in the country while maintaining its rooted music. The chart success of the 2010 FIFA World Cup song Waka Waka (This Time for Africa), which featured South African band Freshlyground-resulted in one of the country's first major chart topping hits by their own artist, launching a great amount of inspiration to other local instrumentalists. Following the success, Die Antwoord became one of the first acts of the country to obtain three albums that charted in the top 150 of the Billboard 200, marking new highs for the country's music industry. One of the band's singles, "Enter The Ninja," also obtained top 50 positions in the United Kingdom and Australia.

 Rap 
Rapper AKA also received a high amount of recognition by 2013, becoming famous for local chart topping hits, including "Congratulate" and "All Eyes On Me." The country introduced its first official, internationally recognized music chart Mediaguide, later renamed Entertainment Monitoring Africa. The chart currently relies on airplay for its charting positions, as opposed to others that also count physical purchases, downloads, and streams. South African rapper Emtee kept working on his music throughout his late teen years. He released his hit single "Roll Up" which had gained critical success. In 2010, Emtee collaborated with South African rapper Maraza on a song titled "In It To Win It". They appeared on Channel O's show HeadRush''. In 2016, he won best rap album at the 22nd South African Music Awards. Emtee had collaborated with AKA, Wizkid, Nasty C, Fifi, Cooper, A-Reece, and B3nchMArQ.

Afrobeats 
As the decade continued the rise of Afrobeats, it had its roots in Ghana and Nigeria and the genre became more recognizable outside Africa. Such acts like Wizkid and Davido had gained major success. Wizkid had won artist of the year at the MTV Africa Music Awards in 2016 and was involved with the writing production of Drake's "One Dance." By June 2016, he had received a total of 34 awards from 106 nominations. He was also the recipient of a BET Award, two MOBO Award, five The Headies Awards, two Channel O Music Video Awards, six Nigeria Entertainment Awards, two Ghana Music Awards, two Dynamix All Youth Awards, two City People Entertainment Awards, and a Future Award. In addition, he had been nominated three times at the MTV Europe Music Awards as well as four times at the World Music Awards. Davido was the recipient of a BET Award, a Kora Award, a Channel O Music Video Award, a Ghana Music Award, a Nigeria Music Video Award, 2 MTV Africa Music Awards, 2 African Muzik Magazine Awards, 5 The Headies Awards, 7 Nigeria Entertainment Awards and 2 Dynamix All Youth Awards. Together, they are some of the best selling artists in Nigeria.

In recent years, the music industry had progress in Ghana. Ghana had many contemporary styles of music due to the geographical scale in Africa but these evolved into a much more contemporary style. Competition amongst the number of artists in Ghanaian music had emerged. One of these styles is known as the 'azonto.'  Rapper Guru had produced a number of hits, including "lapaz Toyota."

See also 

 2000s in music
 Dance music
 List of Hot 100 number-one singles of the 2010s (U.S.)
 List of UK Singles Chart number ones of the 2010s
 Synthwave

References 

2010s in music
2010s decade overviews